The Conference of the Latin Bishops of the Arabic Regions (CELRA) (French: Conférence des Evêques Latins dans les Régions Arabes) is an episcopal conference of the Catholic Church which gathers the Latin Church bishops in the Arab States of the Middle East, North Africa, East Africa and Cyprus.

History
The Conference was established on March 31, 1967 by the Congregation for the Evangelization of Peoples, and its statutes were confirmed in 1989.

Members and Bodies
They are part of the Conference, the titular bishops, emeritus, assistants and auxiliary staff of the dioceses following:

Latin Patriarch of Jerusalem (Israel, Palestine, Jordan and Cyprus)
Archdiocese of Baghdad (Iraq)
Diocese of Djibouti (Djibouti)
Diocese of Mogadishu (Somalia)
Apostolic Vicariate of Aleppo (Syria)
Apostolic Vicariate of Alexandria (Egypt)
Apostolic Vicariate of Beirut (Lebanon)
Apostolic Vicariate of Northern Arabia (Saudi Arabia, Bahrain, Kuwait, and Qatar)
Apostolic Vicariate of Southern Arabia (United Arab Emirates, Oman, and Yemen)

List of Presidents
1965 - 1970: Alberto Gori

1970 - 1987: Giacomo Giuseppe Beltritti

1987 - 2008: Michel Sabbah

2008 - 2016: Fouad Twal

2016 - Present: Pierbattista Pizzaballa

References

External links
 http://www.gcatholic.org/dioceses/conference/001.htm
 Conference of the Latin Bishops of the Arabic Regions - Union Between Christians

Latin
Catholic Church in Africa
Catholic Church in the Middle East
Christian organizations established in 1967
Latin Church